
This is a list of Christian radio stations in Canada by province.

Defunct stations

Manitoba
Winnipeg - CFEQ (107.1 FM) - In April 2013, this station received approval for a change in format, from Christian music to classical and jazz, for various reasons. The change became effective in November 2013.

Ontario
Candy Mountain - CJOA-1 (93.1 FM) - This rebroadcast transmitter closed in June 2004 and was deleted from the license in 2006.
Dryden - CJIV-FM (97.3 FM) - The station ceased operations due to financial problems; its licence was cancelled at station's request on August 31, 2013.

Godfrey - CJCE-FM (93.7 FM) Camp IAWAH Christian Youth Centre - Last license was renewed from January 1, 2009 to August 31, 2015. No license renewals for CJCE-FM had been issued since. Its unknown when the station left the air and its believed that CJCE-FM is no longer broadcasting. 
Peterborough - CJMB-FM (90.5 FM) - The station is still broadcasting, but now with a sports and talk format; station switched from a Christian format in mid-September 2013.
Sudbury - CKSO-FM (101.1 FM) - Although there have been no media references to the station going out of business, in the fall of 2006 two companies applied to the CRTC for new Sudbury stations on the 101.1 FM frequency. To date, CKSO-FM remains off the air.
Timmins - CHIM-FM (102.3 FM) and its transmitters in North Bay, Iroquois Falls, Kirkland Lake, New Liskeard, Sault Ste. Marie, Elliot Lake, Chapleau, Wawa, and Kapuskasing, ON and Red Deer, AB - The CRTC denied the license renewal application for the station, and it went off the air on November 30, 2012.

Saskatchewan
Caronport - CJOS-FM (92.7 FM) - This was licensed to Briercrest Bible College as a campus radio station that broadcast religious programming. The license was relinquished in 2006.

Alberta
Lethbridge - CKVN-FM (98.1 FM) - This station was licensed to Golden West Radio. In Broadcast Decision CRTC 2014-400, Clear Sky Radio Inc. received approval from CRTC to acquire the assets of CKVN-FM and remove conditions of licence that would allow it to move away from a Christian music format.  On September 1, 2014, the station changed its call letters to CKBD-FM, and on September 22, 2014 re-launched as 98.1 "The Bridge", playing modern music aimed at the 18-34 year-old demographic.

See also
Christian radio

References

Christian